Epicedia wrayi is a species of beetle in the family Cerambycidae. It was described by Waterhouse in 1887. It is known from Malaysia.

References

Lamiini
Beetles described in 1887